Jucemar Luiz Domingos de Ambrózio (born 29 July 1980 in Criciúma), or simply Jucemar, is a Brazilian right back who played for FC Dinamo Tbilisi.

Jucemar previously played for Criciúma Esporte Clube, Coritiba Foot Ball Club and Grêmio Foot-Ball Porto Alegrense. Jucemar appearaed in 45 competitvive matches for Criciúma. He last played for CSA at age 31.

Honours
Rio Grande do Sul State League: 2007

References

External links 

Jucemar at Placar
Jucemar at Globo Esporte

1980 births
Living people
Brazilian footballers
Criciúma Esporte Clube players
Coritiba Foot Ball Club players
Grêmio Foot-Ball Porto Alegrense players
FC Dinamo Tbilisi players
Association football defenders